Concordia Bay (Spanish: Ensenada del Norte) is on the north shore of East Falkland in the Falkland Islands. It is between Foul Bay and Salvador Water. It is also near Cape Dolphin, and the northern end of the Falkland Sound.

References

Bays of East Falkland